Turka is a genus of robber flies in the family Asilidae. There are at least four described species in Turka.

Species
These four species belong to the genus Turka:
 Turka cervinus (Loew, 1856) c
 Turka nudus (Lehr, 1996) c g
 Turka tridentatus (Loew, 1871) c g
 Turka zaitzevi (Lehr, 1996) c
Data sources: i = ITIS, c = Catalogue of Life, g = GBIF, b = Bugguide.net

References

Further reading

External links

 
 

Asilidae
Asilidae genera